The Gymnasium Erasmianum is a school in Rotterdam (also known under its Dutch name "Erasmiaans Gymnasium").

History
Founded in 1328, it is the second oldest school in the Netherlands with recorded date of establishment (after the Johan de Witt-gymnasium in Dordrecht, established 1253). The privilege to found a Latin school was granted to the town of Rotterdam before Rotterdam received full city rights and therefore the school predates the birth of the city itself by nearly twenty years. 
It was renamed in 1842, after the famous Rotterdam theologian and humanist Desiderius Erasmus (1466–1536). The school is more than a century older than its namesake, and it is unclear whether he attended it.

The school was located at the corner of the Coolsingel and the Laurensstraat until 1937, nowadays C&A, a clothing store, is located at that place, and the school at the Wytemaweg. In May 1940, Rotterdam was heavily bombed by the German aggressor, but miraculously the building survived. During the war, the occupying German troops used the building as one of their headquarters.

Profile
In the Netherlands, there are several levels of secondary education, the highest being the vwo, pre-university secondary education. In the past decades, many schools have merged with schools of higher or lower levels to form wide-scope community schools. Some gymnasiums, such as the Gymnasium Erasmianum are among the few remaining high-level-only schools, and has managed to avoid merging because of its high number of students. Another special property of Gymnasia is that they offer compulsory classes in the ancient languages Latin and Ancient Greek.

The school is widely known for its large number of students with non-Dutch roots. There are more students with non-Dutch roots at the Gymnasium Erasmianum than at any other Gymnasium in the Netherlands.

The school serves 1,170 students and 80 teachers. The school's motto is "Ex Pluribus Unum", meaning "unity through diversity".

Notable people

Teachers
 J. H. Leopold, Dutch poet
 H.B.G. Casimir, physicist
 Édouard Piaget,  Swiss entomologist

Students
 Gijs van Aardenne,  politician
 Harry Borghouts, Queen's Commissioner in the province North Holland
 Jacob Clay, scientist
 Daan Bovenberg,  professional footballer
 Edsger W. Dijkstra, computer scientist
 Robbert Dijkgraaf, scientist
 Ida Gerhardt, a student of Leopold and poet 
 Alfred Kossmann, poet and prose writer
 E.H. Kossmann, historian
 Herman Johannes Lam,  botanist
 Ramsey Nasr, poet and actor
 Jan Romein, journalist and historian
 Ebru Umar, columnist
 Johan Witteveen, economist, politician, and author

The RGB
The RGB (Rotterdamse Gymnasiasten Bond) is the school's society, organized by the students for the students. Every year the RGB organizes parties, theater, music and dance evenings and several cultural events.

The RGB has its own anthem in Latin:

Vivat haec societas
Gaudium quae paret.
Semper floreat et crescat,
Longe et late clara fiat,
Vivat haec societas
Erasmi Alumnorum.

Vivant semper Socii
In sodalitate.
Vivant tutor et fautores,
Virgines et amatores,
Vivat haec societas
Erasmi Alumnorum

Every year the students elect a new board for the Bond. Any senior student on the school can be elected. The board consists of several functions, with a Latin name:

Praeses; president
Quaestor; treasurer
Ab-actis; secretary
Vice-Praeses; vice-president
Cultus; organizer of cultural events
Sporticus; organizer of sport events
Assessor; creates posters, memberships cards, and event tickets

Other organizations
Other than the RGB, there are several active organizations on the Gymnasium Erasmianum, organised by the school's board, teachers and students alike. Some examples are;

 De Tolle lege: the school's own newspaper.
 Koinothrex: A group of students who arrange a camp for the first class once a year.
 Debatingsociety Pro et Contra: The society organizes debates available to the whole school. Every year they go to several tournaments.
 The GSA: The Gender and Sexuality Association is an organisation consisting of students that promotes freedom and outing of gender and sexuality within the school. 
 The LLR: The Leerlingenraad is an organization in which students are given the possibility to have a say in the decisions made at the school
 The MR: the medezeggenschapsraad
 Semper Floreat: a society for alumni
 The Ouderraad: an organization which grants parents the possibility to make some changes to the school.
 De Techniek: a group of students responsible for the technical support of events on school.
 The Remix-Crew: A group of students that organize a musical event called 'Remix' twice a year

See also
 List of the oldest schools in the world

References

External links

  Erasmiaans Gymnasium, official website

1328 establishments in Europe
Educational institutions established in the 14th century
Gymnasiums in the Netherlands
Schools in Rotterdam